The Jutaí River ( is a river of the state if Amazonas, Brazil.
It is one of the headwaters of the Matupiri River.

The Matupiri River  forms in the  Rio Amapá Sustainable Development Reserve where the Jutaí and Novo rivers converge.

See also
List of rivers of Amazonas

References

Rivers of Amazonas (Brazilian state)